Juan Manuel Sara (born 13 October 1976, in Buenos Aires) is a retired Argentine footballer and currently the manager of Ferro Carril Oeste. He also holds Italian nationality.

Playing career
Sara was playing with Argentine side Almirante Brown and Nueva Chicago, Czech side Hradec Králové, Paraguayan side Cerro Porteño before move to Scotland.

Sara moved to Scottish side Dundee in 2000. Sara played 88 league matches during his three-and-a-half years with the Dark Blues but left in November 2003 due to Dundee's threat of administration. He previously had a short loan spell with Coventry City, where he scored once against Nottingham Forest.

Sara moved on to Reggiana in December 2003. Sara played the rest of that season before joining Irish side Shelbourne in August 2004, where he played for a year. In July 2005, Sara moved back to his homeland with Huracán but stayed for only a few months, joining Liechtensteiner side Vaduz in January 2006. After a year with them, Sara moved to Italy with Gallipoli, again spending only a few months before his departure in June 2007. Sara joined Lucena shortly afterwards, then returned to Challenge League for Locarno. On 20 January 2009 joined to Cerro Porteño. In March 2010, he was loaned to River Plate Puerto Rico of the Puerto Rico Soccer League. He officially retired from playing in 2014.

Coaching career 
Sara entered coaching in 2015 with Club Atlético Ituzaingó under manager Diego Martínez, before leaving the following year with Martínez and his coaching team to Cañuelas. In 2018, Sara again followed Martínez to Estudiantes de Buenos Aires as assistant coach. He would later follow Martínez in roles at Godoy Cruz in 2020 and Club Atlético Tigre in 2021. While with El Matador, Sara helped the club win the 2021 Primera Nacional and achieve promotion to the Argentine Primera División. In December 2021, Sara would leave Martínez and was named manager of Primera Nacional side Deportivo Maipú. At the end of the season, Sara became manager of his final club as a player and fellow Primera Nacional side Ferro Carril Oeste.

Miscellany
In 2001 Sara attended a recording session to provide a reading of The Serenity Prayer which was used as a basis for the track Sara's Song (I Thank God) as part of the album It's My Dundee to provide funds for the Dundee F.C. youth development fund.

Personal life

Sara is a devout Christian.

References

External links 
  
  
 Juan Sara at BDFA.com.ar 
 Juan Sara at Football.ch 
 

1978 births
Living people
Footballers from Buenos Aires
Association football forwards
Argentine footballers
Argentine expatriate footballers
Nueva Chicago footballers
Club Atlético Huracán footballers
Cerro Porteño players
Dundee F.C. players
Coventry City F.C. players
Shelbourne F.C. players
League of Ireland players
Scottish Premier League players
FC Locarno players
Lucena CF players
A.C. Reggiana 1919 players
A.S.D. Gallipoli Football 1909 players
FC Vaduz players
Argentine expatriate sportspeople in Liechtenstein
Lobos BUAP footballers
Correcaminos UAT footballers
Ferro Carril Oeste footballers
Expatriate footballers in Liechtenstein
Expatriate footballers in England
Expatriate footballers in Italy
Expatriate footballers in Paraguay
Expatriate footballers in Scotland
Expatriate footballers in Switzerland
Expatriate footballers in Mexico
Expatriate association footballers in the Republic of Ireland
Argentine expatriate sportspeople in Italy
Argentine expatriate sportspeople in Spain
Argentine expatriate sportspeople in Scotland
Argentine expatriate sportspeople in England
Argentine expatriate sportspeople in Switzerland
Argentine expatriate sportspeople in Paraguay
Argentine expatriate sportspeople in Ireland
Ferro Carril Oeste managers
Argentine football managers